KD and variants may refer to:

Businesses and organizations
 KD Avia, a former Russian airline (IATA code KD)
 KD Transportation Group, a South Korean bus company
 Kalstar Aviation (IATA code KD)
 Kappa Delta, a National Panhellenic sorority
 Kendell Airlines, a former Australian airline (IATA code KD)
 Keolis Downer, an Australian public transport operator
 Kings Dominion, an amusement park located in Doswell, Virginia
 Köln-Düsseldorfer, a river cruise operator based in Cologne, Germany

Science and technology
 Dissociation constant (KD), a type of equilibrium constant
 K-d tree, a data structure in computing 
 Kawasaki disease, an inflammatory disease causing vasculitis and sometimes aneurysm
 Kienböck's disease, an avascular necrosis in the lunate bone of the wrist
 Toyota KD Engine, a engine manufactured by Toyota
 Gene knockdown, a genetic modification technique

Other uses
K.D., a 2019 Tamil film
 KD Station, a meat packing plant, later business and entertainment complex, in Sioux City, Iowa, US
 Kapal DiRaja, a ship prefix used in the Royal Malaysian Navy
 Katamari Damacy, a PlayStation 2 video game
 Kentucky Deluxe, a brand of American whiskey
 k.d. lang, a Canadian pop singer-songwriter
 Kevin Durant, a professional basketball player
 Krisdayanti, an Indonesian singer and actress
 K?d, an American DJ and record producer
 Christian Democrats (Sweden), a Swedish political party
 Christian Democrats (Finland), a Finnish political party
 Khaki drill, a fabric used in 20th-century British military uniforms
 Knock-down kit, a kit of part to assemble something
 Kraft Dinner, a convenience food product
 Kuwaiti dinar, a currency, sometimes represented "K.D." (ISO code KWD)
 Kill-death ratio, a statistic in player-versus-player combat multiplayer video games

See also 
 K-Dee, American rapper
 Kadee, model railroad company
 Kaydee, pop band
 Kaydee (disambiguation)